Jadur Bashi is a 1977 Bengali romantic film directed by Abdul Latif Bachchu. Story, screenplay and dialogue written by Ahmed Zaman Chowdhury. Apu Sarwar has played the main character in the film. Along with Suchorita, Razzak, Bulbul Ahmed, ATM Shamsuzzaman in the supporting roles. The film won the Bangladesh National Film Awards in three categories.

Cast
 Apu Sarwar – Jadu
 Suchorita – Pakhi
 Razzak – Mohar Ali
 Bulbul Ahmed – Doctor Yusuf
 Olivia – Amena
 Shabana – Najma
 Inam Ahmed – Tamiz Ali, the father of the Pakhi
 Sultana Zaman – Mother of Jadu
 Sumita Devi – The grandmother of the Pakhi
 ATM Shamsuzzaman – The uncle of the Pakhi
 Ariful Haque
 Tele Samad – Pair Ali
 Dildera
 Sharwari
 Supriya
 Parab Babu – Madhu Moyra
 Zia Uddin
 Abdul Malek

Music
Jadur Bashi film's music was directed by Azad Rahman. The soundtrack for the film was composed by Ahmed Zaman Chowdhury. The film's singers are Sabina Yasmin, Runa Laila and Khurshid Alam.

Track listing

Award
3rd National Film Awards
 Won: Best Music Director – Azad Rahman
 Won: Best Female Playback singer- Runa Laila
 Won: Best Screenwriter – Ahmed Zaman Chowdhury

References

External links
 

1977 films
Bengali-language Bangladeshi films
Bangladeshi drama films
1970s Bengali-language films
Films whose writer won the Best Screenplay National Film Award (Bangladesh)
1977 drama films